Omwony Ojwok (1 June 1947 – 11 November 2007) was a Ugandan politician. He served as director of the Ugandan AIDS Commission (1994–1999), Minister for Northern Rehabilitation (1999–2001) and State Minister for Economic Monitoring (2001–2007). He died of heart failure at the age of 60.

References

1947 births
2007 deaths
People educated at Ntare School
Government ministers of Uganda